The following is a list of game boards of the Parker Brothers/Hasbro board game Monopoly adhering to a particular theme or particular locale in Oceania. Lists for other regions can be found here. The game is licensed in 103 countries and printed in 37 languages.

Australia 
The Australian Edition features streets from each of the nation's capital cities. They are colour-arranged in order of population (Darwin streets as the brown group through to Sydney as green), with Canberra as the top blue group. The McGuinness-McDermott Foundation released three special editions to raise money for children's cancer research. The three editions were Adelaide (city) and the Adelaide and Port Adelaide football clubs. There has also been versions for Queensland, New South Wales, Victoria and Western Australia, with proceeds from each going to charities. McGuinness-McDermott Foundation also released a 2007 AFL Premiership edition which features the Geelong Football Club. Early 2008 saw the release of 2 more McGuinness-McDermott Foundation AFL editions, those being Carlton and Collingwood Football Clubs. McGuinness-McDermott Foundation are also responsible for releasing a V8 Supercars edition and in late 2008 will be releasing an Icons of South Australia charity edition.

Two other unofficial editions were released with relation to Kasoft Software. They were released as part of the Amstrad CPC prototype.

Australian Football League Edition

Let's Go Caravanning and Camping Edition.  Commissioned by the Caravan Industry Association of Australia in 2016 

Bunnings Warehouse Edition

In 2021, Australia Post, the post office, issued a customised edition.

New Zealand 

Wellington Edition

Southland Edition

References

External links 
 Over 1700 Monopoly versions, updated continuously (some unofficial)
 Database of street names in local editions
 Monopoly games and places from around the world
 Rich Man series review (Chinese)
 Bucharest Version: Detailed article
 MONOPOLY around the World and a contact for different MONOPOLY boards
 Nearly one hundred monopoly boards listed at MonopolyBoards.Info

Monopoly (game)
Monopoly

it:Edizioni del Monopoli